Alina Natalie Devecerski (born 27 March 1983) is a Swedish pop singer from Sundbyberg. She is managed by Anders Johansson and signed to EMI Sweden.

At age 19, she started singing in a girl band. She has also written songs for many other artists. In 2010, she launched her solo career working for a year and a half writing solo material for herself only. Her 2012 debut single was "Jag svär". Her follow-up single "Flytta på dej!" hit the Sverigetopplistan, the official Swedish Singles Chart and stayed at No. 1 for 2 weeks, and was No. 1 in Norway and Denmark. She has been signed to appear at many music festivals in Sweden to promote her singing career.

Discography

Albums

Singles

References

External links 

Official website (archived)

Swedish songwriters
Swedish-language singers
1983 births
Living people
People from Sundbyberg Municipality
Swedish people of Serbian descent
Swedish people of Finnish descent
21st-century Swedish singers
21st-century Swedish women singers